David Viaene (born July 14, 1965) was a player in the National Football League for the New England Patriots and Green Bay Packers in 1989, 1990, and 1992. He played at the collegiate level at the University of Minnesota Duluth and the University of Wisconsin–Platteville. He was drafted in the 8th round (214th overall) in the 1988 NFL Draft by the Houston Oilers.

Biography
Viaene was born in Appleton, Wisconsin. He attended Kaukauna High School in Kaukauna, Wisconsin.

See also
New England Patriots players
Green Bay Packers players

References

New England Patriots players
Green Bay Packers players
Sportspeople from Appleton, Wisconsin
People from Kaukauna, Wisconsin
Players of American football from Wisconsin
Minnesota Duluth Bulldogs football players
Wisconsin–Platteville Pioneers football players
1965 births
Living people